Nathan Thrall is an American author, essayist, and journalist based in Jerusalem. Thrall is the author of The Only Language They Understand: Forcing Compromise in Israel and Palestine (Metropolitan/Henry Holt, 2017; Picador, 2018) and a contributor to The New York Times Magazine, the London Review of Books, and The New York Review of Books. His reporting, essays, and criticism have also appeared in GQ, The Guardian Long Read, The New Republic, Slate, and The New York Times, and have been translated into more than a dozen languages.

Thrall is the former Director of the Arab-Israeli Project at the International Crisis Group, where he covered Israel, the West Bank, Gaza, and Israel's relations with its neighbors from 2010 to 2020. Thrall's reporting and analysis have been cited on the floor of the UN General Assembly by Noam Chomsky and in the UN Security Council by former UN Special Envoy Lakhdar Brahimi. His analysis is often featured in print and broadcast media, including the Associated Press, the BBC, CNN, Democracy Now!, The Economist, The Guardian, Jacobin, The New York Times, PRI, Reuters, Slate, and The Wall Street Journal, The Washington Post. The historian Perry Anderson wrote in the New Left Review that Thrall has written "the most acute analysis of American policy towards Israel, from Clinton to Obama. ... In their combination of clear-eyed criticism and level-headed realism, Thrall's reports from and on Israel have consistently been outstanding." The New York Review of Books described Thrall as having "published a series of articles over recent years—notably in The New York Times Magazine, The Guardian, and the London Review of Books—that have defined the new intellectual and political parameters for what is increasingly recognized as Israel-Palestine's one-state (or post-two-state) reality," and the Financial Times called him "one of the best-informed and most trenchant observers of the conflict."

Background and education
Thrall received a BA from the University of California, Santa Barbara's College of Creative Studies and an M.A. in politics from Columbia University. A former member of the editorial staff of The New York Review of Books, he was hired at the International Crisis Group by Robert Malley. At the start of his tenure at the International Crisis Group, Thrall lived in Gaza. In 2011, he moved to Jerusalem.

Critical reception

The Only Language They Understand 
Thrall's critically acclaimed essay collection The Only Language They Understand: Forcing Compromise in Israel and Palestine (Metropolitan/Henry Holt, 2017; Picador, 2018) was hailed in The New York Times ("a brilliant job...smart and hard to dispute"), Foreign Affairs ("Thrall has consistently been one of the sharpest observers of the Israeli–Palestinian conflict"), Time ("Life is short, and writings about Israel and the Palestinians can be very, very long. So it's a good thing there's Nathan Thrall"), and The New York Review of Books ("By far the most cogent of the new books [on Israel–Palestine]"). The Jewish Book Council's Bob Goldfarb wrote that his book, The Only Language They Understand: Forcing Compromise in Israel and Palestine, "brings unparalleled clarity to the dynamics of Israeli-Palestinian relations, and is an essential guide to the history, personalities, and ideas behind the conflict." Mosaic selected the book as one of the best of the year, writing, "A knowledgeable and bold retelling of the Israel-Palestinian conflict that forces readers to take a serious and fresh look at their assumptions. Throughout its counterintuitive retelling of this history, it offers an unusually provocative and sometimes startling contribution to the genre." On the publisher's website, Mark Danner described the book as "brilliant," writing, "Eloquent, fact-rich, full of vivid characters, and relentlessly contemporary in its narrative, The Only Language They Understand is a withering indictment of conventional wisdom―and a necessary, essential book."

Trump's Middle East Plan 
The day after President Donald Trump released the Trump peace plan, "Peace to Prosperity: A Vision to Improve the Lives of the Palestinian and Israeli People," Thrall published a critique of it in The New York Times, "Trump's Middle East Peace Plan Exposes the Ugly Truth: This isn't a break with the status quo. It's the natural culmination of decades of American policy." Trump's Special Envoy for International Negotiations, Jason Greenblatt, criticized Thrall's op-ed: "A 1-sided, distorted analysis. The ideas are dangerous to an important ally, based on an approach that has driven Palestinians (who deserve a better future) into a ditch. Time to embrace reality, seek a brighter future & stop being an arm-chair critic." Thrall replied: "Refreshing to see that only days after releasing the Trump plan, one of its chief architects, @GreenblattJD, has come around to opposing approaches that are 1-sided, distorted, dangerous to US allies, & designed to drive Palestinians (who deserve better) into a ditch."

The Separate Regimes Delusion 
In January 2021, the London Review of Books published Thrall's article, "The Separate Regimes Delusion," which argued, "The premise that Israel is a democracy, maintained by Peace Now, Meretz, the editorial board of Haaretz and other critics of occupation, rests on the belief that one can separate the pre-1967 state from the rest of the territory under its control. A conceptual wall must be maintained between two regimes: (good) democratic Israel and its (bad) provisional occupation." Thrall's article was praised in Haaretz by veteran columnist Gideon Levy, who wrote, "the American writer Nathan Thrall, who lives in Jerusalem, published an eye-opening and mind-expanding piece in The London Review of Books .... Thrall doesn't hesitate to criticize the supposedly liberal-Zionist and leftist organizations, from Meretz and Peace Now to Yesh Din and Haaretz. All of them believe that Israel is a democracy and oppose annexation because it could undermine their false belief that the occupation is happening somewhere else, outside of Israel, and is only temporary." Thrall's piece was cited in an April 2021 Human Rights Watch report finding that Israel is committing the crime of apartheid. In an article about The Separate Regimes Delusion, Philip Weiss wrote: "Thrall's thrust is that liberal Zionists have bolstered the persistence of apartheid by insisting that that's not happening in Israel, it's only the West Bank. Israel is a democracy! There are two regimes here! Thrall's piece is a careful and lacerating exposition of the damage caused by the claim that the two 'regimes' can be separated."

A Day in the Life of Abed Salama 
In March 2021, The New York Review of Books published Thrall's piece, "A Day in the Life of Abed Salama: One man's quest to find his son lays bare the reality of Palestinian life under Israeli rule," together with an animated trailer. The article was covered in The Washington Post, Foreign Policy, The American Prospect, Jewish Currents, European publications, the Israeli newspaper Haaretz, a podcast episode hosted by New York Times columnist Peter Beinart, and a two-part, forty-minute segment on Democracy Now! Mondoweiss stated that "Thrall narrates his tale with detachment and precision, reminiscent of Hersey's Hiroshima." Longreads called it "an astonishing feat of reporting" and named it a Best Feature of 2021, stating: "This isn't just the best feature I read this year. It's one of the best I've ever read, period. ... Expertly researched and brilliantly told, Thrall's feature is a masterpiece."

A news article in Haaretz noted that Ro Khanna praised "A Day in the Life of Abed Salama" at the plenary session of the J Street conference and sent what is known as a "Dear Colleague" letter to the nearly 100 members of the Congressional Progressive Caucus, urging them to read the "extraordinary article" that "deepens and enriches our understanding of Israel-Palestine" and "deserves our attention." Attached to the Congressional letter were endorsements of the piece J.M. Coetzee, Desmond Tutu, Michelle Alexander, Frank Lowenstein, Aaron David Miller, David Shulman, Avraham Burg, former director general of Israel's Foreign Ministry Alon Liel, Ilan Baruch, Hanan Ashrawi, and the heads of B'Tselem and al-Haq, leading Israeli and Palestinian human rights organizations. Thrall's piece was quoted from in the Report of the Special Rapporteur on the situation of human rights in the Palestinian territories occupied since 1967, presented to the 47th session of the United Nations Human Rights Council.

Works

Books 

 Hardcover ; Electronic  (electronic book).  Paperback . Audio book: Tantor Audio, 2017. ASIN: B071VGJDQK.

Book Chapters 
 "Can Hamas be part of the solution?," in Jamie Stern-Weiner ed., Moment of Truth: Tackling Israel–Palestine's Toughest Questions. New York, New York: OR Books, 2018.

Feature Articles 
 A Day in the Life of Abed Salama. The New York Review of Books, March 19, 2021.
The Separate Regimes Delusion. London Review of Books, Vol. 43, No. 2, January 21, 2021 (Online January 8, 2021).
Also published in Arabic in Arabi21, 11 January 2021; in Hebrew in Sicha Mekomit, February 8, 2021; and in French in Orient XXI, February 24, 2021.
How the Battle Over Israel and Anti-Semitism is Fracturing American Politics. The New York Times Magazine, March 31, 2019.
BDS: How a Controversial Non-Violent Movement has Transformed the Israeli-Palestinian Debate. The Guardian Long Read, August 14, 2018.
Also published in Hebrew in Sicha Mekomit, 9 October 2018; in Arabic in Arabi21, August 26, 2018; in French in Orient XXI, November 28, 2018; in Italian in Internazionale, September 2018; and in German in Le Monde Diplomatique, December 2018.
The First 50 Years of Israeli Occupation.  And the Next.. The New York Times June 2, 2017.
Israel-Palestine: The Real Reason There's Still No Peace. The Guardian Long Read, May 16, 2017.
Obama & Palestine: The Last Chance. The New York Review of Books, September 10, 2016.
Rage in Jerusalem. London Review of Books, 4 December 2014.
Israel & the US: The Delusions of Our Diplomacy. The New York Review of Books, 9 October 2014. 
See also the accompanying exchange with Senator George J. Mitchell, Why Did George Mitchell Resign?. The New York Review of Books, November 6, 2014.
Faith-Based Diplomacy. Matter, September 18, 2014. 
Also published in Arabic in Medium, September 19, 2014.
Hamas's Chances. London Review of Books, Vol. 36, No. 16, August 21, 2014, pp. 10–12 (Online August 1, 2014).
 Also published in Arabic in Al-Quds al-Arabi, August 13, 2014.
Whose Palestine?. The New York Review of Books, June 19, 2014. 
Palestine After Fayyad. Foreign Affairs, April 18, 2013.
Also published in Spanish in esglobal, May14,  2013; and in French in Rue89, May 8, 2013.
Our Man in Palestine. The New York Review of Books, October 14, 2010.
Eastern Promises. The New Republic, September 9, 2009.
Truth or Dare. GQ, July 2009.

Book Reviews 
The Israelis Were Shooting from One Direction, the Palestinians from the Other. Review of The Way to the Spring, by Ben Ehrenreich, London Review of Books, Vol. 38, No. 23, December 1, 2016.
Along the Divide. Review of Periphery: Israel's Search for Middle East Allies by Yossi Alpher, London Review of Books, Vol. 37, No. 21, November 5, 2015.
Feeling Good About Feeling Bad. Review of My Promised Land by Ari Shavit, London Review of Books, Vol. 36, No. 19, October 9, 2014. 
What Future for Israel? l. Review of Tested by Zion by Elliott Abrams, Israel, Jordan, and Palestine by Asher Susser, The Future of the Jews by Stuart E. Eizenstat, and Beyond the Two-State Solution by Yehouda Shenhav, The New York Review of Books, August 15, 2013. 
Persian Aversion. Review of Treacherous Alliance by Trita Parsi, Commentary, March 2008. 
Specters of al-Qaida. Review of The Siege of Mecca by Yaroslav Trofimov, The Jerusalem Post, November 22, 2007.

Essays 
 A Mideast Plan and the Ugly Truth. The New York Times, January 30, 2020. Published online on January 29, 2020, as "Trump's Middle East Peace Plan Exposes the Ugly Truth: This isn't a break with the status quo. It's the natural culmination of decades of American policy," The New York Times, January 29, 2020. 
Also published in Arabic in Arabi21, February 11, 2020.
How the Idea of Return Has Shaped the Israeli-Palestinian Conflict for 70 Years. Time, May 14, 2018.
The Next War in Gaza Is Brewing. Here's How to Stop It. With Robert Blecher, The New York Times, July 30, 2017.
Israeli Force Led to Arab Accommodation. Council on Foreign Relations, June 2, 2017.
Trump Chases His Ultimate Deal. The New Yorker, May 22, 2017.
The Two-Stage Solution: Toward a Long-Term Israeli-Palestinian Truce. Mediterranean Politics, Volume 21, Issue 3, 2016.
Mismanaging the Conflict in Jerusalem. The New York Times, November 19, 2015.
The End of the Abbas Era. London Review of Books, October 20, 2015.
 Also published in Spanish in esglobal, 23 October 2015.
Abbas' Bum Bombshell. Foreign Affairs, 29 September 2015.
Israeli Fears of Palestinian Recognition are Unwarranted. The New York Times, October 16, 2014.
Also published in Spanish in esglobal, October 23, 2014.
How the West Chose War in Gaza. The New York Times, July 18, 2014.
Also published in Arabic in Arabi21, July 19, 2014.
Netanyahu, Then and Now. The New York Review of Books, July 31, 2013.
The Palestinian Authority in Question. With Robert Blecher, Le Figaro (French), June 30, 2013.
West Bank: Buying the Calm Before the Storm. With Robert Blecher, Al-Hayat (Arabic), June 1, 2013.
Palestine's Changing Politics. With Robert Blecher, Foreign Policy, May 29, 2013.
Not Enough Daylight on Israel. The New York Times, October 22, 2012. 
Hamas Divided. Rue89, September 19, 2012.
Also published in Spanish in esglobal, September 7, 2012; and in German in Die Ziet, September 19, 2012. 
The Third Intifada is Inevitable. The New York Times, June 24, 2012.
Also published in French in Rue89, July 20, 2012.
Hamas's Rivals in Gaza. Al-Quds al-Arabi (Arabic), July 1, 2011.
Hurting Moderates, Helping Militants. The New York Times, May 5, 2011.
Also published in Arabic in Al-Akhbar, May 18, 2011.

Interviews 
The Endless Occupation, A New Understanding. Nathan Thrall interviewed by Matt Seaton. The New York Review of Books, March 20, 2021.
We Can't Expect Joe Biden to Stop Supporting Apartheid: An Interview with Nathan Thrall. Interview by Branko Marcetic. Jacobin, May 26, 2021.
"Pourquoi maintenant?": sur les origines de la guerre des onze jours. An interview with Nathan Thrall by Shahin Vallée. Le Grand Continent (French), May 29, 2021.
"Why Now?": On the Origins of the Eleven-Day Wa r. Shahin Vallée interviews Nathan Thrall, German Council on Foreign Relations, June 2, 2021.
Israel-Palestine: A Turning Point? with Nathan Thrall. Interview conducted by Mouin Rabbani, Jadaliyya, May 25, 2021.
Part 1: Nathan Thrall on the Historic Palestinian Uprising Against Israeli Control from the River to the Sea. Interview by Amy Goodman and Nermeen Shaikh. Democracy Now!, May 13, 2021.
Part 2: Nathan Thrall on "A Day in the Life of Abed Salama" & Reality of Palestinian Life Under Israeli Rule. Interview by Amy Goodman and Nermeen Shaikh, Democracy Now!, May 13, 2021.
Complete Success for Israeli Settlers: an Interview with Nathan Thrall. Interview by Jannie Schipper, NRC (Dutch), April 27, 2021.
"Occupied Thoughts": Nathan Thrall, Peter Beinart, and "A Day in the Life of Abed Salama." Nathan Thrall interviewed by Peter Beinart, Foundation for Middle East Peace, March 31, 2021.
Israel, the UAE, and Normalization: An Interview with Nathan Thrall. Interview by Robert Malley and Naz Modirzadeh, International Crisis Group, September 3, 2020.
Gaza Protests Mark Shift in Palestinian National Consciousness. An interview with Nathan Thrall, International Crisis Group, April 2, 2018. 
The 1967 Arab-Israeli war took six days. But 50 years later, it's still not over. An interview of Nathan Thrall by Ishaan Tharoor, The Washington Post, June 7, 2017.
Nathan Thrall: "Israelis and Palestinians understand only force." Interview by Cyrille Louis, Le Figaro (French), June 14, 2017.
Pressuring Peace: An Interview with Nathan Thrall. Interview by Eli Massey, Jacobin, October 11, 2017.
The Political Scene: The Two State Solution. Interview of Nathan Thrall and David Remnick by Dorothy Wickenden, The New Yorker, March 16, 2015.

References

External links
Nathan Thrall  |  Official Website
Nathan Thrall  |  Authors  |  Macmillan Publishers
The New York Review of Books
London Review of Books
The New York Times Magazine
International Crisis Group

American male journalists
American newspaper reporters and correspondents
American investigative journalists
American foreign policy writers
American male non-fiction writers
Living people
Year of birth missing (living people)